Gabi Calleja is an LGBTIQ rights activist  in Malta.
She read for a Masters in Youth and Community Studies at the University of Malta. From 2010 to 2019, she was the coordinator of the Malta Gay Rights Movement. As of 2014, she is co-chair of the Executive Board of ILGA Europe, a lesbian and gay advocacy group. In 2014 she spoke publicly in favor of Denmark's removing a law which had required transgender people to undergo sterilization before they were legally allowed to change their gender.

In addition to her work on LGBT rights, she is also a senior executive in the public sector in Malta, and has worked in the fields of teaching, drug prevention, training, community development, fundraising, and project management. In 2005, the “School Attendance Improvement” Report, a review of absenteeism from school in Malta, was published; she had been part of the group appointed to write it.

She received a 2012 International Women of Courage award.

References

External links
 Gabi Calleja's Twitter

Maltese LGBT rights activists
Living people
Year of birth missing (living people)
Maltese LGBT people
Recipients of the International Women of Courage Award